A list of the best Bosnian First Tier goalscorers from 1995 (as the First League) to the present day (as the Premier League). Nemanja Bilbija holds the record for most scored goals in a season, 33, scored in the 2021–22 season while playing for Zrinjski Mostar. Mersudin Ahmetović has scored the fewest goals as top goalscorer, only 13, scoring them in the 2019–20 season while a part of Sarajevo.

Only three times in the league's history has it happened that there were joint-top goalscorers. The first time being in the 1997–98 season, and the other two times in the 1999–2000 and 2006–07 seasons.

Top goalscorers

Goalscorers by nationality

Top goalscorers by club

See also
Premier League of Bosnia and Herzegovina
First League of Bosnia and Herzegovina

References

Premier League of Bosnia and Herzegovina players
Association football player non-biographical articles